Alona Hillel (born 1 March 2006) is an Israeli rhythmic gymnast. She won a silver medal in teams at the 2020 European Championships.

Career

Junior 
Hillel debuted in major competitions at the 2020 European Championships in Kyiv, she won silver in the team category along Daria Atamanov and the senior group. The following year she was part of the junior group that competed at the European Championships in Varna along Eliza Banchuk, Shani Bakanov, Emili Malka and Simona Rudnik, they won two bronze medals in the All-Around and with 5 ribbons.

Senior 
In 2022 Alona became a senior and competed at the World Cup stage in Portimão, she ended 16th in the All-Around, 30th with hoop, 20th with ball, 18th with clubs and won silver in the ribbon final behind Eva Brezalieva.

References 

2006 births
Living people
Israeli rhythmic gymnasts
Medalists at the Rhythmic Gymnastics European Championships